Frederick James Seabrook (9 January 1899 – 7 August 1979) was an English first-class cricketer active 1919–35 who played for Gloucestershire and Cambridge University. He was born in Brockworth and died in Cirencester. He appeared in 143 first-class matches as a left-handed batsman who occasionally bowled slow left arm orthodox spin. Seabrook scored 5,335 career runs with a highest score of 136, one of eight centuries; he held 82 catches and took eight wickets with a best return of four for 77.

References

1899 births
1979 deaths
English cricketers
Gloucestershire cricketers
Cambridge University cricketers
Gentlemen cricketers
North v South cricketers
Non-international England cricketers
English cricketers of 1919 to 1945
L. H. Tennyson's XI cricket team
People from Brockworth, Gloucestershire
Cricketers from Gloucestershire